Kanuri Ranjith Kumar ( 24 March 1938 – 11 June 1984) was an Indian Film Producer.  born into a wealthy agricultural  family to Kanuri Ramananda Chowdary and VimalaDevi in a rural village Kowtharam in Krishna District of Andhra Pradesh. He founded "Ranjith Movies" banner  with the help of his uncle K L N Prasad who is a well known Industrialist & Politician. Ranjith Kumar entered the film world  as a producer  in 1973 with his first Telugu film venture "Chikati Velugulu"  directed by K.S.Prakash Rao followed by a successful movie "Mana Voori Katha" starring Krishna and Jaya Pradha in 1976. Ranjith Kumar has won various laurels for his films. He produced entertainers with not only commercial interests but also social concern. It would be right to say that his films reflect human values.   In 1977,  he went on to produce the super hit film "Maa Iddari kadha" with the Legend N.T.Rama Rao who played dual role.

Ranjith Kumar also made significant contributions on the social front with films like "Naalaaga Endaro"  starring Narayana Rao & Rupa  in 1978. This film was selected  for`The best film of the year’ and won the prestigious Golden "Nandi Award"  by the Govt. of Andhra Pradesh. Apart from this, he produced a bi-lingual film titled  "Tholi Kodi Koosindi" in Telugu and  "Engavuru Kannagi" in Tamil which is also directed by K. Balachander.  This was named the second best feature film providing wholesome entertainment by the Andhra Pradesh govt., and presented ‘Nandi Award’ for the year 1979. In 1983, he simultaneously made two films in Telugu titled "Chattaniki Veikallu"  and "Lanke Bindelu", both starring Krishna, Jayasudha & Madhavi. He also produced a Malayalam film "Adayam" starring Nedumudi Venu and Poornima Jayaram.

Most of his films take a stand on many burning social issues among the poor classes in our society and were received well by the crowds. As a producer, his motive was not only to make money, but also to help the society through his thought-provoking subjects, where  Films have a large and deep influence in South India.

Artists and technicians who  worked in his films include N T. Rama Rao, Krishna, Raja Babu, Kaikala Satyanarayana, Narayana Rao, K.Balachander, K.S.Prakash Rao, V.S.R.Swamy, Chakravarthy, Loknath, Eeranki Sharma, Vijaya Nirmala, Jaya Pradha, Jayasudha, Vanisree, Madhavi, Manjula etc.,

Ranjith Kumar has worked as an Executive Committee Member for Andhra Pradesh Film Chamber and  also served as the First Executive Secretary for Filmnagar housing society. Being a father-figure to many in the Industry, Ranjith Kumar encouraged the growth of friendly feelings amongst the producers and technicians to achieve absolute unity.  He has put his best efforts to promote and develop the Telugu film industry in Hyderabad. He worked his way to the top with his hard work and strong determination to reach his goal, come what may.

On 11 June 1984  he died.

Awards
 Nandi Award for Second Best  Feature Film - Silver - Tholi Kodi Koosindi (1981)

References

1984 deaths
1938 births
Telugu film producers
People from Krishna district
Film producers from Andhra Pradesh